Sanctuary is an original novel written by David A. McIntee and based on the long-running British science fiction television series Doctor Who. It features the Seventh Doctor and Bernice. A prelude to the novel, also penned by McIntee, appeared in Doctor Who Magazine #225. The novel was unusual for being a purely historical story in which no science fiction elements appeared beyond the basic premise of the series. Such stories had not appeared in Doctor Who since 1982's Black Orchid, and not regularly since The Highlanders in 1967–68.

Synopsis
As the Albigensian Crusade draws to its bloody conclusion, men inflict savage brutalities on each other in the name of religion. Forced to temporarily abandon ship, the TARDIS crew find their lives intertwined with warring Templars, crusaders and heretics. While the Doctor begins a murder investigation in a besieged fortress, Bernice finds herself drawn to an embittered mercenary who has made the heretics’ fight his own. And both time travellers realize that to leave history unchanged they may have to sacrifice far more than their lives.

External links
Sanctuary Prelude
The Cloister Library - Sanctuary

1995 British novels
1995 science fiction novels
Virgin New Adventures
Novels by David A. McIntee
Seventh Doctor novels
Fiction set in the 13th century